Myedu is a small town located in Kanbalu Township, Sagaing Region, Myanmar (Burma). The town was the fief of King Hsinbyushin (r. 1763–1776) of Konbaung Dynasty, who was also known as Myedu Min.
Myedu is an ancient town before Buddha was born.

References

Populated places in Sagaing Region
Shwebo District